Microtominae is a subfamily of assassin bugs in the family Reduviidae. There are at least 2 genera and about 19 described species in Microtominae.

Genera
These two genera belong to the subfamily Microtominae:
 Homalocoris Perty, 1833
 Microtomus Illiger, 1807

References

Further reading

 
 
 
 

Reduviidae
Articles created by Qbugbot